= Nandua, Virginia =

Unincorporated community in Virginia, United States

Coordinates: 37°37′27″N 75°51′00″W

Nandua is an unincorporated community in Accomack County, Virginia, United States.
